Channel 25 may refer to several television stations:

 Channel 25 (Mongolia), a commercial television channel in Mongolia
 WROB-LD, A TV25 branded LPTV Cluster in Kansas City and Topeka
 Chérie 25, a French television channel
 Net 25, a Philippine terrestrial/cable television network
 BPTV25, a Binh Phuoc Television station (before 2008) in Vietnam

Canada
The following television stations broadcast on digital channel 25 (UHF frequencies covering 536-542 MHz) in Canada:
 CBLFT-DT in Toronto, Ontario
 CBOT-DT in Ottawa, Ontario
 CBVT-DT in Quebec City, Quebec
 CKRT-DT-2 in Dégelis, Quebec

The following television stations operate on virtual channel 25 in Canada:
 CBLFT-DT in Toronto, Ontario
 CFVS-DT in Val-d'Or, Quebec

See also
 Channel 25 TV stations in Mexico
 Channel 25 branded TV stations in the United States
 Channel 25 digital TV stations in the United States
 Channel 25 low-power TV stations in the United States
 Channel 25 virtual TV stations in the United States

25